The 2021–22 Los Angeles Lakers season was the 75th season of the franchise, its 74th season in the National Basketball Association (NBA), its 62nd season in Los Angeles, and its 23rd season playing home games at Crypto.com Arena. The team was coached by Frank Vogel in his third and final year as Lakers head coach. They competed as a member of the Western Conference's Pacific Division, finishing the season 11th with a 33–49 record, one game behind the last spot for the NBA Play-In Tournament. It was the team's worst record since 2016–17, slightly better than the Lakers' worst five seasons.

After the acquisitions of Russell Westbrook and Carmelo Anthony in the offseason, the Lakers were widely considered by experts to be the favorites to win the Western Conference. The team remained stable with a .500 percentage for the last direct playoff access spot until January 7, and remained within play-in contention until March 30. Despite LeBron James' best points per game average since 2005–06, and a number of scoring and age-related records, the Lakers disappointed, with a combination of injury and underperformances, plus an aged and mismanaged roster.

On April 5, the Lakers were eliminated from both playoff and play-in contention for the first time since 2018–19 and the seventh time in nine years after a 121–110 loss to the Phoenix Suns. It was the fourth time in James' career that he missed the NBA playoffs and the second time in his four years with the Lakers. It was also the third time and first since 2015 that Westbrook missed the playoffs when he played for the Oklahoma City Thunder, having previously only missed the playoffs in his debut in 2009. The Lakers' failure to make the play-in/playoffs was widely regarded by experts to be one of the greatest underachievements in NBA history. James, Davis, Westbrook, and Anthony were selected to the NBA 75th Anniversary Team, the Lakers being the team with the most active players.

James was the only Laker to make the All-Star cut, with Anthony Davis having a second consecutive injury-laden season. Due to injuries, the Lakers used 41 different starting lineups, and the trio of James, Davis, and Westbrook played only 21 games together, compiling an 11–10 record; the Lakers were just 20–33 when only two of the three were playing together. They were the only team to not have a single five-man lineup that played 100 minutes, finished in the bottom 10 in both offensive and defensive efficiency, and ranked 21st in defensive rating after finishing third in 2019–20 and first in 2020–21. Due to an ankle injury in March, James fell out of a close three-player race for the NBA scoring title, finishing with only 56 games played, two less than necessary to qualify; aged 37, he would have broken Michael Jordan's record of oldest scoring leader at 35.

Following the season, head coach Frank Vogel was fired on April 11, 2022. Vogel led the team in 2020 to their first title since 2010 and one first-round exit in 2021, and he finished with an overall 127–98 record.

Previous season 

The Lakers concluded the 2020–21 season with a 42–30 record, finishing with the third seed in the Pacific Division and the seventh seed in the Western Conference, which was not enough for a direct playoff spot. In the NBA Play-In Tournament, they defeated the Golden State Warriors to earn them the seventh seed in the 2021 NBA playoffs. The Lakers lost to the Phoenix Suns in the first round in six games despite being up 2–1, making it the first time that LeBron James lost in the first round of the playoffs. Anthony Davis suffered a strained left groin in Game 4, and he was also sidelined in Game 5, when the Suns took a 3–2 lead. He returned in Game 6 but played only five minutes after reaggravating the injury. The Lakers were eliminated 4–2.

Offseason
In August 2021, the Lakers traded for Russell Westbrook in a trade that also sent two future 2nd round draft picks (2024 and 2028) to the Lakers and Montrezl Harrell, Kyle Kuzma, Kentavious Caldwell-Pope, and the 22nd pick of the 2021 NBA draft to the Washington Wizards. This trade formed a new superteam of LeBron James, Anthony Davis, and Westbrook in the Western Conference.

Draft

Preseason

Game log

|-style="background:#fcc;"
| 1
| October 3
| Brooklyn
| 
| Malik Monk (15)
| Kendrick Nunn (7)
| Bazemore, Horton-Tucker (3)
| Staples Center16,000
| 0–1
|-style="background:#fcc;"
| 2
| October 6
| @ Phoenix
| 
| Malik Monk (18)
| Anthony Davis (8)
| Rajon Rondo (5)
| Footprint Center12,434
| 0–2
|-style="background:#fcc;"
| 3
| October 8
| @ Golden State
| 
| Dwight Howard (23)
| Dwight Howard (12)
| Rajon Rondo (6)
| Chase Center18,064
| 0–3
|-style="background:#fcc;"
| 4
| October 10
| Phoenix
| 
| Anthony Davis (19)
| DeAndre Jordan (5)
| Anthony Davis (6)
| Staples Center13,844
| 0–4
|-style="background:#fcc;"
| 5
| October 12
| Golden State
| 
| Anthony Davis (20)
| Russell Westbrook (10)
| Russell Westbrook (6)
| Staples Center11,526
| 0–5
|-style="background:#fcc;"
| 6
| October 14
| @ Sacramento
| 
| LeBron James (30)
| Anthony Davis (12)
| Austin Reaves (7)
| Golden 1 CenterAttendance not reported
| 0–6

Regular season

Standings

Division

Conference

Game log

|-style="background:#fcc;"
| 1
| October 19
| Golden State
| 
| LeBron James (34)
| Davis, James (11)
| James, Rondo (5)
| Staples Center18,997 
| 0–1
|-style="background:#fcc;"
| 2
| October 22
| Phoenix 
| 
| LeBron James (25)
| Anthony Davis (14)
| Russell Westbrook (9) 
| Staples Center18,997
| 0–2
|-style="background:#cfc;"
| 3
| October 24
| Memphis
| 
| Carmelo Anthony (28)
| Davis, Jordan (8)
| Russell Westbrook (13)
| Staples Center 18,997
| 1–2
|-style="background:#cfc;"
| 4
| October 26
| @ San Antonio
| 
| Anthony Davis (35)
| Anthony Davis (17)
| Russell Westbrook (8)
| AT&T Center18,354
| 2–2
|-style="background:#fcc;"
| 5
| October 27
| @ Oklahoma City
| 
| Anthony Davis (30)
| Russell Westbrook (14)
| Russell Westbrook (13)
| Paycom Center15,783
| 2–3
|-style="background:#cfc;"
| 6
| October 29
| Cleveland
| 
| LeBron James (26)
| Anthony Davis (9)
| LeBron James (8)
| Staples Center18,997
| 3–3
|-style="background:#cfc;"
| 7
| October 31
| Houston
| 
| Carmelo Anthony (23)
| Anthony Davis (13)
| LeBron James (8)
| Staples Center16,448
| 4–3

|-style="background:#cfc;"
| 8
| November 2
| Houston
| 
| LeBron James (30)
| Davis, Westbrook (9)
| LeBron James (10)
| Staples Center18,997
| 5–3
|-style="background:#fcc;"
| 9
| November 4
| Oklahoma City
| 
| Anthony Davis (29)
| Anthony Davis (18)
| Davis, Westbrook (5)
| Staples Center18,997
| 5–4
|-style="background:#fcc;"
| 10
| November 6
| @ Portland
| 
| Malik Monk (13)
| Jordan, Westbrook (9)
| Russell Westbrook (6)
| Moda Center19,393
| 5–5
|-style="background:#cfc;"
| 11
| November 8
| Charlotte
| 
| Anthony Davis (32)
| Davis, Westbrook (14)
| Russell Westbrook (12)
| Staples Center18,997
| 6–5
|-style="background:#cfc;"
| 12
| November 10
| Miami
| 
| Malik Monk (27)
| Anthony Davis (13)
| Russell Westbrook (14)
| Staples Center18,997
| 7–5
|-style="background:#fcc;"
| 13
| November 12
| Minnesota
| 
| Anthony Davis (22)
| Dwight Howard (10)
| Rajon Rondo (8)
| Staples Center18,997
| 7–6
|-style="background:#cfc;"
| 14
| November 14
| San Antonio
| 
| Anthony Davis (34)
| Anthony Davis (15)
| Rondo, Westbrook (7)
| Staples Center18,997
| 8–6
|-style="background:#fcc;"
| 15
| November 15
| Chicago
| 
| Talen Horton-Tucker (28)
| Horton-Tucker, Westbrook, Davis, Howard (6)
| Russell Westbrook (8)
| Staples Center18,997
| 8–7
|-style="background:#fcc;"
| 16
| November 17
| @ Milwaukee
| 
| Talen Horton-Tucker (25)
| Talen Horton-Tucker (12)
| Russell Westbrook (15)
| Fiserv Forum17,341
| 8–8
|-style="background:#fcc;"
| 17
| November 19
| @ Boston
| 
| Anthony Davis (31)
| Davis, James (6)
| Russell Westbrook (6)
| TD Garden19,156
| 8–9
|-style="background:#cfc;"
| 18
| November 21
| @ Detroit
| 
| Anthony Davis (30)
| Anthony Davis (10)
| Russell Westbrook (10)
| Little Caesars Arena15,532
| 9–9
|-style="background:#fcc;"
| 19
| November 23
| @ New York
| 
| Russell Westbrook (31)
| Russell Westbrook (13)
| Russell Westbrook (10)
| Madison Square Garden19,812
| 9–10
|-style="background:#cfc;"
| 20
| November 24
| @ Indiana
| 
| LeBron James (39)
| DeAndre Jordan (11)
| LeBron James (6)
| Gainbridge Fieldhouse15,572
| 10–10
|-style="background:#fcc;"
| 21
| November 26
| Sacramento
| 
| LeBron James (30)
| Russell Westbrook (10)
| James, Westbrook (10)
| Staples Center18,997
| 10–11
|-style="background:#cfc;"
| 22
| November 28
| Detroit
| 
| LeBron James (33)
| Anthony Davis (10)
| James, Westbrook (9)
| Staples Center18,997
| 11–11
|-style="background:#cfc;"
| 23
| November 30
| @ Sacramento
| 
| Anthony Davis (25)
| Dwight Howard (13)
| Russell Westbrook (6)
| Golden 1 Center12,459
| 12–11

|-style="background:#fcc;"
| 24
| December 3
| L.A. Clippers
| 
| Anthony Davis (27)
| LeBron James (11)
| Russell Westbrook (9)
| Staples Center18,997
| 12–12
|-style="background:#cfc;"
| 25
| December 7
| Boston
| 
| LeBron James (30)
| Anthony Davis (16)
| Russell Westbrook (11)
| Staples Center18,997
| 13–12
|-style="background:#fcc;"
| 26
| December 9
| @ Memphis
| 
| Anthony Davis (22)
| LeBron James (10)
| LeBron James (11)
| FedExForum16,334
| 13–13
|-style="background:#cfc;"
| 27
| December 10
| @ Oklahoma City
| 
| LeBron James (33)
| Russell Westbrook (9)
| Russell Westbrook (7)
| Paycom Center16,523
| 14–13
|-style="background:#cfc;"
| 28
| December 12
| Orlando
| 
| LeBron James (30)
| LeBron James (11)
| LeBron James (10)
| Staples Center18,997
| 15–13
|-style="background:#cfc;"
| 29
| December 15
| @ Dallas
| 
| LeBron James (24)
| Anthony Davis (12)
| Russell Westbrook (9)
| American Airlines Center20,270
| 16–13
|-style="background:#fcc;"
| 30
| December 17
| @ Minnesota
| 
| Isaiah Thomas (19)
| LeBron James (10)
| Rajon Rondo (8)
| Target Center17,136
| 16–14
|-style="background:#fcc;"
| 31
| December 19
| @ Chicago
| 
| LeBron James (31)
| LeBron James (14)
| Russell Westbrook (8)
| United Center20,917
| 16–15
|-style="background:#fcc;"
| 32
| December 21
| Phoenix
| 
| LeBron James (34)
| Russell Westbrook (10)
| Russell Westbrook (5)
| Staples Center18,997
| 16–16
|-style="background:#fcc;"
| 33
| December 23
| San Antonio
| 
| LeBron James (36)
| Howard, James (9)
| LeBron James (6)
| Staples Center18,997
| 16–17
|-style="background:#fcc;"
| 34
| December 25
| Brooklyn
| 
| LeBron James (39)
| Russell Westbrook (12)
| Russell Westbrook (11)
| Crypto.com Arena18,997
| 16–18
|-style="background:#cfc;"
| 35
| December 28
| @ Houston
| 
| LeBron James (32)
| Russell Westbrook (12)
| LeBron James (11)
| Toyota Center18,104
| 17–18
|-style="background:#fcc;"
| 36
| December 29
| @ Memphis
| 
| LeBron James (37)
| LeBron James (13)
| Russell Westbrook (12)
| FedExForum17,794
| 17–19
|-style="background:#cfc;"
| 37
| December 31
| Portland
| 
| LeBron James (43)
| LeBron James (14)
| Russell Westbrook (12)
| Crypto.com Arena18,997
| 18–19

|-style="background:#cfc;"
| 38
| January 2
| Minnesota
| 
| LeBron James (26)
| LeBron James (7)
| James, Westbrook (5)
| Crypto.com Arena18,343
| 19–19
|-style="background:#cfc;"
| 39
| January 4
| Sacramento
| 
| LeBron James (31)
| Dwight Howard (14)
| Talen Horton-Tucker (6)
| Crypto.com Arena17,919
| 20–19
|-style="background:#cfc;"
| 40
| January 7
| Atlanta
| 
| LeBron James (32)
| Russell Westbrook (11)
| Russell Westbrook (13)
| Crypto.com Arena18,997
| 21–19
|-style="background:#fcc;"
| 41
| January 9
| Memphis
| 
| LeBron James (35)
| LeBron James (9)
| LeBron James (7)
| Crypto.com Arena18,288
| 21–20
|-style="background:#fcc;"
| 42
| January 12
| @ Sacramento
| 
| LeBron James (34)
| Russell Westbrook (12)
| James, Westbrook (6)
| Golden 1 Center12,199
| 21–21
|-style="background:#fcc;"
| 43
| January 15
| @ Denver
| 
| LeBron James (25)
| LeBron James (9)
| Malik Monk (6)
| Ball Arena19,520
| 21–22
|-style="background:#cfc;"
| 44
| January 17
| Utah
| 
| LeBron James (25)
| Howard, Westbrook (8)
| LeBron James (7)
| Crypto.com Arena17,238
|22–22
|-style="background:#fcc;"
| 45
| January 19
| Indiana
| 
| LeBron James (30)
| LeBron James (12)
| Talen Horton-Tucker (6)
| Crypto.com Arena17,818
| 22–23
|-style="background:#cfc;"
| 46
| January 21
| @ Orlando
| 
| LeBron James (29)
| Russell Westbrook (11)
| Russell Westbrook (7)
| Amway Center18,846
| 23–23
|-style="background:#fcc;"
| 47
| January 23
| @ Miami
| 
| LeBron James (33)
| LeBron James (11)
| Russell Westbrook (9)
| FTX Arena19,973
| 23–24
|-style="background:#cfc;"
| 48
| January 25
| @ Brooklyn
| 
| LeBron James (33)
| LeBron James (7)
| James, Reaves (6)
| Barclays Center18,126
| 24–24
|-style="background:#fcc;"
| 49
| January 27
| @ Philadelphia
| 
| Anthony Davis (31)
| Anthony Davis (12)
| Malik Monk (5)
| Wells Fargo Center20,953
| 24–25
|-style="background:#fcc;"
| 50
| January 28
| @ Charlotte
| 
| Russell Westbrook (35)
| Austin Reaves (8)
| Anthony, Westbrook (5)
| Spectrum Center19,469 
| 24–26
|-style="background:#fcc;"
| 51
| January 30
| @ Atlanta
| 
| Malik Monk (33)
| Malik Monk (10)
| Russell Westbrook (12)
| State Farm Arena17,391
| 24–27

|-style="background:#cfc;"
| 52
| February 2
| Portland
| 
| Anthony Davis (30)
| Anthony Davis (15)
| Russell Westbrook (13)
| Crypto.com Arena17,259
| 25–27
|-style="background:#fcc;"
| 53
| February 3
| @ L.A. Clippers
| 
| Anthony Davis (30)
| Anthony Davis (17)
| Malik Monk (7)
| Crypto.com Arena19,068
| 25–28
|-style="background:#cfc;"
| 54
| February 5
| New York
| 
| James, Monk (29)
| Anthony Davis (17)
| LeBron James (10)
| Crypto.com Arena18,997 
| 26–28
|-style="background:#fcc;"
| 55
| February 8
| Milwaukee
| 
| LeBron James (27)
| Russell Westbrook (10)
| LeBron James (8)
| Crypto.com Arena18,997
| 26–29
|-style="background:#fcc;"
| 56
| February 9
| @ Portland
| 
| LeBron James (30)
| Davis, James (7)
| Horton-Tucker, James (7)
| Moda Center19,393
| 26–30
|-style="background:#fcc;"
| 57
| February 12
| @ Golden State
| 
| LeBron James (26)
| LeBron James (15)
| LeBron James (8)
| Chase Center18,064 
| 26–31
|-style="background:#cfc;"
| 58
| February 16
| Utah
| 
| LeBron James (33)
| LeBron James (8)
| James, Westbrook (6)
| Crypto.com Arena17,787
| 27–31
|-style="background:#fcc;"
| 59
| February 25
| L.A. Clippers
| 
| LeBron James (21)
| Dwight Howard (16)
| Malik Monk (6)
| Crypto.com Arena18,997 
| 27–32
|-style="background:#fcc;"
| 60
| February 27
| New Orleans
| 
| LeBron James (32)
| Dwight Howard (11)
| LeBron James (3)
| Crypto.com Arena17,536
| 27–33

|-style="background:#fcc;"
| 61
| March 1
| Dallas
| 
| LeBron James (26)
| LeBron James (12)
| Russell Westbrook (8)
| Crypto.com Arena17,857 
| 27–34
|-style="background:#fcc;"
| 62
| March 3
| @ L.A. Clippers
|  
| LeBron James (26)
| James, Westbrook (8)
| D.J. Augustin (6)
| Crypto.com Arena (LAC)19,068
| 27–35
|-style="background:#cfc;"
| 63
| March 5
| Golden State
| 
| LeBron James (56)
| LeBron James (10)
| Malik Monk (5)
| Crypto.com Arena18,997
| 28–35
|-style="background:#fcc;"
| 64
| March 7
| @ San Antonio
| 
| Talen Horton-Tucker (18)
| Russell Westbrook (10)
| Russell Westbrook (6)
| AT&T Center18,354 
| 28–36
|-style="background:#fcc;"
| 65
| March 9
| @ Houston
| 
| Russell Westbrook (30)
| LeBron James (14)
| LeBron James (12)
| Toyota Center18,055 
| 28–37
|-style="background:#cfc;"
| 66
| March 11
| Washington
| 
| LeBron James (50)
| LeBron James (7)
| Russell Westbrook (9)
| Crypto.com Arena18,997
| 29–37
|-style="background:#fcc;"
| 67
| March 13
| @ Phoenix
| 
| LeBron James (31)
| LeBron James (7)
| LeBron James (6)
| Footprint Center17,071
| 29–38
|-style="background:#fcc;"
| 68
| March 14
| Toronto
| 
| LeBron James (30)
| Gabriel, James (9)
| Talen Horton-Tucker (5)
| Crypto.com Arena18,228
| 29–39
|-style="background:#fcc;"
| 69
| March 16
| @ Minnesota
| 
| LeBron James (19)
| Dwight Howard (6)
| Malik Monk (6)
| Target Center17,136
| 29–40
|-style="background:#cfc;"
| 70
| March 18
| @ Toronto
| 
| LeBron James (36)
| Russell Westbrook (10)
| Russell Westbrook (10)
| Scotiabank Arena19,800
| 30–40
|-style="background:#fcc;"
| 71
| March 19
| @ Washington
| 
| LeBron James (38)
| James, Westbrook (10)
| Russell Westbrook (8)
| Capital One Arena20,476
| 30–41
|-style="background:#cfc;"
| 72
| March 21
| @ Cleveland
| 
| LeBron James (38)
| LeBron James (11)
| LeBron James (12)
| Rocket Mortgage FieldHouse19,432
| 31–41
|-style="background:#fcc;"
| 73
| March 23
| Philadelphia
| 
| Howard, Westbrook (24)
| Gabriel, Westbrook (9)
| Johnson, Westbrook (8)
| Crypto.com Arena18,997
| 31–42
|-style="background:#fcc;"
| 74
| March 27
| @ New Orleans
| 
| LeBron James (39)
| Dwight Howard (10)
| Monk, Reaves, Westbrook (6) 
| Smoothie King Center18,516 
| 31–43
|-style="background:#fcc;"
| 75
| March 29
| @ Dallas
| 
| Malik Monk (28)
| Russell Westbrook (8)
| Russell Westbrook (6)
| American Airlines Center20,382 
| 31–44
|-style="background:#fcc;"
| 76
| March 31
| @ Utah
| 
| Russell Westbrook (24)
| Dwight Howard (12)
| Russell Westbrook (7)
| Vivint Arena18,306 
| 31–45

|-style="background:#fcc;"
| 77
| April 1
| New Orleans
| 
| LeBron James (38)
| Anthony Davis (12)
| Malik Monk (7)
| Crypto.com Arena18,997
| 31–46
|-style="background:#fcc;"
| 78
| April 3
| Denver
| 
| Anthony Davis (28)
| Russell Westbrook (10)
| Anthony Davis (8)
| Crypto.com Arena16,273 
| 31–47
|-style="background:#fcc;"
| 79
| April 5
| @ Phoenix
| 
| Russell Westbrook (28)
| Anthony Davis (13)
| Austin Reaves (6)
| Footprint Center17,071 
| 31–48
|-style="background:#fcc;"
| 80
| April 7
| @ Golden State
| 
| Talen Horton-Tucker (40)
| Dwight Howard (12)
| Malik Monk (4)
| Chase Center18,064
| 31–49
|-style="background:#cfc;"
| 81
| April 8
| Oklahoma City
| 
| Stanley Johnson (21)
| Horton-Tucker, Howard, Johnson (8)
| Horton-Tucker, Monk (5)
| Crypto.com Arena18,997 
| 32–49
|-style="background:#cfc;"
| 82
| April 10
| @ Denver
| 
| Malik Monk (41)
| Austin Reaves (16)
| Austin Reaves (10)
| Ball Arena 19,520
| 33-49

Player stats

Regular season statistics 

*Total with the Lakers only

Roster

Transactions

Overview

Trades

Free agency

Re-signed

Additions

Subtractions

Notes

References

External links
 2021–22 Los Angeles Lakers at Basketball-Reference.com

Los Angeles Lakers seasons
Los Angeles Lakers
Los Angeles Lakers
Los Angeles Lakers
Lakers
Lakers